The Honourable Mr Justice Aarif Tyebjee Barma (born 1959) is a Hong Kong judge, and currently serves as Justice of Appeal of the Court of Appeal of Hong Kong.

Biography

Early life

Born in Mumbai, India, Barma grew up in Hong Kong, where he attended Diocesan Boys' School. He then read law at Exeter College, Oxford obtaining a BA in 1981 and a BCL in 1982.

Legal career

Barma was called to the Bar at Middle Temple in 1983, and to the Hong Kong Bar later the same year. After doing most of his pupillage in London, he returned to Hong Kong to complete his pupillage and commenced practice there as a barrister at the end of 1984. In 2002, he was appointed Senior Counsel. He was a member of Temple Chambers during his time in private practice.

Barma sat as a Deputy High Court Judge in 2002 and 2003.

In September 2003, Barma was appointed a Judge of the Court of First Instance of the High Court of Hong Kong. He dealt mostly with company, insolvency, commercial and tax cases. In 2012, Barma became the Judge in charge of the Admiralty List.

In November 2012, Barma was appointed a Justice of Appeal of the Court of Appeal of the High Court of Hong Kong.

In September 2015, Barma was elected a Bencher of the Middle Temple.

References

Living people
1959 births
Alumni of Exeter College, Oxford
Alumni of the University of Oxford
Hong Kong judges
Hong Kong Senior Counsel
Barristers of Hong Kong
Hong Kong people of Indian descent